Tom Savage (born 27 July 1979) is a British social entrepreneur, founder of award-winning Blue Ventures and 3Desk.

In 2007, Savage won the Edge Upstart Young Social Entrepreneur of the Year Award and was interviewed in The Guardian. Savage was also cited as an inspiration to Prime Minister Gordon Brown in his book Britain's Everyday Heroes.

References

1979 births
British business executives
Alumni of the University of Oxford
Living people